Ángel Pacheco (born 21 November 1952) is a Venezuelan boxer. He competed in the men's featherweight event at the 1976 Summer Olympics.

1976 Olympic results
Below is the record of Angel Pacheco at the 1976 Montreal Olympics:

 Round of 64: defeated Sandalio Calderon (Colombia) by decision, 5-0
 Round of 32: defeated Carlos Calderon (Puerto Rico) by decision, 5-0 
 Round of 16: lost to Angel Herrera (Cuba) by decision, 0-5

References

1952 births
Living people
Venezuelan male boxers
Olympic boxers of Venezuela
Boxers at the 1976 Summer Olympics
Boxers at the 1975 Pan American Games
Pan American Games bronze medalists for Venezuela
Pan American Games medalists in boxing
Place of birth missing (living people)
Featherweight boxers
Medalists at the 1975 Pan American Games
20th-century Venezuelan people